Gnorimoschema brackenridgiella is a moth in the family Gelechiidae. It was described by August Busck in 1903. It is found in North America.

The forewings are grayish, very profusely dusted with dark fuscous, with a dark fuscous spot on the disc. The hindwings are pale ochreous gray.

References

Gnorimoschema
Moths described in 1903